Sunnyside, also known as the S.D. Styles Summer Residence, is a historic home located at Richfield Springs in Otsego County, New York. It was built in two stages in 1890 and 1909 and is a dwelling in the Queen Anne style.  It is a 2-story frame house with a shingled exterior. The house is composed of a full 2-story, gable-roofed main block with a -story east addition with a hipped roof. Also on the property is a small carriage barn.

It was listed on the National Register of Historic Places in 1988.

References

Houses on the National Register of Historic Places in New York (state)
Houses completed in 1909
Shingle Style houses
Houses in Otsego County, New York
National Register of Historic Places in Otsego County, New York
Shingle Style architecture in New York (state)